The 1930 United States Senate election in Texas was held on November 4, 1930. Incumbent Democratic U.S. Senator Morris Sheppard was re-elected to a fourth term in office, easily dispatching his challengers.

Democratic primary

Candidates
Robert Lee Henry, former U.S. Representative from Waco
C. A. Mitchner
Morris Sheppard, incumbent Senator since 1913

Results

General election
Sixteen counties failed to report their results to the Texas Secretary of State in time to be canvassed, so their results are not included in the official vote totals.

Results

See also 
 1930 United States Senate elections

References 

Texas
1930
Senate